Ana Belén Sánchez (born 16 February 1976) is a Spanish golfer who plays on the Ladies European Tour. She represented Spain in the 1996 Espirito Santo Trophy and turned professional the following year. She has one Ladies European Tour win, which came at the 2004 BMW Ladies Italian Open, and was a member of the European team at the 2003 Solheim Cup.

Professional wins

Ladies European Tour wins
2004 BMW Ladies Italian Open

Other wins
2005 Lalla Meryem Cup

Team appearances
Amateur
European Girls' Team Championship (representing Spain): 1993 (winners)
European Ladies' Team Championship (representing Spain): 1995 (winners), 1997
Espirito Santo Trophy (representing Spain): 1996

Professional
Solheim Cup (representing Europe): 2003 (winners)
World Cup (representing Spain): 2005, 2007

Sources:

References

External links

Ana Sánchez personal blog
Ana Sánchez Academy

Spanish female golfers
Ladies European Tour golfers
Solheim Cup competitors for Europe
Mediterranean Games medalists in golf
Mediterranean Games bronze medalists for Spain
Competitors at the 1997 Mediterranean Games
Sportspeople from Málaga
1976 births
Living people
20th-century Spanish women
21st-century Spanish women